Dumlu is a village in the District of Ceyhan, Adana Province, Turkey.  Above the village is a magnificent fortification dating from the period of the Armenian Kingdom of Cilicia. This well-preserved site displays horseshoe-shaped towers, a complex entrance, numerous vaulted undercrofts, and cisterns. This site was the subject of a University of California archaeological survey in 1974 and 1979. Neither these surveys nor the one conducted earlier by G. R. Youngs could find any evidence of Crusader construction or occupation.

References

Villages in Ceyhan District